Fisher Nunatak is a nunatak with rock exposure, standing  west of Mount Crawford of the Sentinel Range, in the Ellsworth Mountains of Antarctica. It was discovered by the Marie Byrd Land Traverse party, 1957–58, under Charles R. Bentley, and was named for Diana D. Fisher, director, Glaciological Headquarters, of the United States – International Geophysical Year Program, 1956–59.

References 

Nunataks of Ellsworth Land